Ghislain Lemaire (born 7 August 1972 in Lure, Haute-Saône) is a French judoka.

Achievements

References

External links
 
 

 Videos on Judovision.org

1972 births
Living people
People from Lure, Haute-Saône
French male judoka
Judoka at the 2004 Summer Olympics
Olympic judoka of France
Sportspeople from Haute-Saône
Mediterranean Games gold medalists for France
Mediterranean Games medalists in judo
Competitors at the 2005 Mediterranean Games
20th-century French people
21st-century French people